Interrupt This Program is a Canadian documentary series, which premiered November 6, 2015 on CBC Television. It is known as Resilient Cities in some markets.

A five-part documentary series about the role of art as a tool of political protest and social change, each episode centres on the creative community in a world city recovering from some form of social crisis, such as war, disaster or political upheaval. The first season's episodes are set in Beirut, Kyiv, Athens, Port-au-Prince, and Medellin. Each episode profiles several young artists working in the city, including at least one expatriate Canadian. The series aims to change perceptions about the cities and allow artists to tell their own stories.

References

External links

2015 Canadian television series debuts
2015 Canadian television series endings
CBC Television original programming
2010s Canadian documentary television series